O věcech nadpřirozených is a 1958 Czechoslovak film. The film was directed by Jirí Krejcík, Jaroslav Mach, and Milos Makovec, and starred Josef Kemr.

References

External links
 

1958 films
Czechoslovak comedy films
1950s Czech-language films
Czech comedy films
1950s Czech films